Code Adam is a missing-child safety program in the United States and Canada, originally created by Walmart retail stores in 1994. This type of alert is generally regarded as having been named in memory of Adam Walsh, the 6-year-old son of John Walsh (the host of Fox's America's Most Wanted).

Adam was abducted from a Sears department store in Hollywood, Florida in 1981. A search was undertaken by Adam's mother, grandmother, and store employees, and public address calls were made for him every 10 to 15 minutes. After approximately 90 minutes of fruitless searching, local law enforcement was called. Sixteen days later, Adam's severed head was found; his body was never recovered.

Today, many department stores, retail shops, shopping malls, supermarkets, amusement parks, hospitals, and museums participate in the Code Adam program. Legislation enacted by Congress in 2003 now mandates that all federal office buildings and base or post exchanges (BX or PX) on military bases adopt the program. Walmart, along with the National Center for Missing & Exploited Children (NCMEC) and the departments of several state Attorneys General, have offered to assist in training workshops in order for other companies to implement the program.

Process
Companies that do implement the program generally place a Code Adam decal at the front of the business.  Employees at these businesses are trained to take the following six steps, according to the National Center for Missing & Exploited Children:
 If a visitor reports a child is missing, a detailed description of the child and what they are wearing is obtained. Specifically, what color and type of shoes the child is wearing; due to how in department stores and other stores selling clothing in particular, it is easier to change a child's clothes but far harder to find different shoes. Additionally, all exterior access to the building is locked and monitored; anyone approaching a door is turned away.
 The employee goes to the nearest in-house telephone and pages Code Adam, describing the child's physical features and clothing. As designated employees monitor front entrances, other employees begin looking for the child.
 If the child is not found within 10 minutes, law enforcement is notified.
 If the child is found and appears to have been lost and unharmed, the child is reunited with the parent or legal guardian.
 If the child is found accompanied by someone other than a parent or legal guardian, reasonable efforts to delay their departure will be used without putting the child, staff, or visitors at risk. Law enforcement will be notified and given details about the person accompanying the child.
 The Code Adam page will be terminated when the child is found or when law enforcement arrives.

See also
 Adam Walsh Child Protection and Safety Act
 AMBER Alert
 Hospital emergency codes
 Lockdown

References

External links
 The National Retail Federation's explanation of Code Adam

Child safety
Missing people organizations
1984 introductions
Law enforcement in Canada
Law enforcement in the United States